John Shelby "Jack" Spong (June 16, 1931 – September 12, 2021) was an American bishop of the Episcopal Church. From 1979 to 2000, he was the Bishop of Newark, New Jersey. A liberal Christian theologian, religion commentator, and author, he called for a fundamental rethinking of Christian belief away from theism and traditional doctrines.

Early life and career
Spong was born in Charlotte, North Carolina, and educated in public schools there. He attended the University of North Carolina at Chapel Hill, where he was elected to the Phi Beta Kappa honor society and graduated with a Bachelor of Arts degree in 1952. He received his Master of Divinity degree from the Virginia Theological Seminary in 1955. He has had honorary Doctor of Divinity degrees conferred on him by Virginia Theological Seminary and Saint Paul's College, Virginia, as well as an honorary Doctor of Humane Letters conferred by Muhlenberg College in Pennsylvania.

In 2005, he wrote: "[I have] immerse[d] myself in contemporary Biblical scholarship at such places as Union Theological Seminary in New York City, Yale Divinity School, Harvard Divinity School and the storied universities in Edinburgh, Oxford and Cambridge."

Spong served as rector of St. Joseph's Church in Durham, North Carolina, from 1955 to 1957; rector of Calvary Parish, Tarboro, North Carolina, from 1957 to 1965; rector of St. John's Church in Lynchburg, Virginia, from 1965 to 1969; and rector of St. Paul's Church in Richmond, Virginia, from 1969 to 1976. He held visiting positions and gave lectures at major American theological institutions, most prominently at Harvard Divinity School. He retired in 2000. As a retired bishop, he was a member of the Episcopal Church's House of Bishops.

Spong was one of the first American bishops to ordain a woman into the clergy, in 1977, and he was the first to ordain an openly gay man, Robert Williams, in 1989. Later the church followed his lead. An Episcopal court ruled that homosexuality was not counter to its principles in 1996, and the church recognized same-sex marriages in 2015.

Spong described his own life as a journey from the literalism and conservative theology of his childhood to an expansive view of Christianity. In a 2013 interview, Spong credited the Anglican bishop John Robinson as his mentor in this journey and said reading Robinson's writings in the 1960s led to a friendship and mentoring relationship with him over many years. Spong also honors Robinson as a mentor in the opening pages of his 2002 book A New Christianity for a New World.

Recipient of many awards, including 1999 Humanist of the Year, Spong was a contributor to the Living the Questions DVD program and was a guest on numerous national television broadcasts (including The Today Show, Politically Incorrect with Bill Maher, Dateline, 60 Minutes, and Larry King Live). Spong's calendar had him lecturing around the world. Spong was the cousin of the United States Senator from Virginia William B. Spong Jr.

According to The Episcopal Diocese of Newark, Bishop Spong suffered a stroke before a speaking engagement in Marquette, Michigan, on Saturday, September 10, 2016.

Writings
Spong's writings rely on Biblical and non-Biblical sources and were influenced by modern critical analysis of these sources (see especially Spong, 1991). He is representative of a stream of thought with roots in the medieval universalism of Peter Abelard and the existentialism of Paul Tillich, whom he called his favorite theologian.

A prominent theme in Spong's writing was that the popular and literal interpretations of Christian scripture are not sustainable and do not speak honestly to the situation of modern Christian communities. He believed in a more nuanced approach to scripture, informed by scholarship and compassion, which can be consistent with both Christian tradition and contemporary understandings of the universe. He believed that theism had lost credibility as a valid conception of God's nature. He stated that he was a Christian because he believes that Jesus Christ fully expressed the presence of a God of compassion and selfless love and that this is the meaning of the early Christian proclamation, "Jesus is Lord" (Spong, 1994 and Spong, 1991). Elaborating on this last idea, he affirmed that Jesus was adopted by God as his son (Born of a Woman 1992), and he says that this would be the way God was fully incarnated in Jesus Christ. He rejects the historical truth claims of some Christian doctrines, such as the virgin birth (Spong, 1992) and the bodily resurrection of Jesus (Spong, 1994). In 2000, Spong was a critic of the Congregation for the Doctrine of the Faith of the Roman Catholic Church's declaration Dominus Iesus, because it reaffirmed the Catholic doctrine that the Roman Catholic Church is the one true Church and that Jesus Christ is the one and only savior for humanity.

Spong was a strong proponent of the church reflecting the changes in society at large. Towards these ends, he called for a new Reformation, in which many of Christianity's basic doctrines should be reformulated.

His views on the future of Christianity were "that we have to start where we are. As I look at the history of religion, I observe that new religious insights always and only emerge from the old traditions as they begin to die. It is not by pitching the old insights out but by journeying deeply through them into new visions that we are able to change religion's direction. The creeds were 3rd- and 4th-century love songs that people composed to sing to their understanding of God. We do not have to literalize their words to perceive their meaning or their intention to join in the singing of their creedal song. I think religion in general and Christianity in particular must always be evolving. Forcing the evolution is the dialog between yesterday's words and today's knowledge. The sin of Christianity is that any of us ever claimed that we had somehow captured eternal truth in the forms we had created."

Spong debated Christian philosopher and apologist William Lane Craig on the resurrection of Jesus on March 20, 2005.

In 1991's Rescuing the Bible from Fundamentalism: A Bishop Rethinks the Meaning of Scripture, Spong argued that St. Paul was homosexual, a theme that was satirized in Gore Vidal's novel Live from Golgotha.

Criticism
Spong claimed that his writings evoked both great support and great condemnation from differing segments of the Christian church.

New Testament Catholic scholar Raymond E. Brown was critical of Spong's scholarship, referring to his studies as "amateur night". Spong frequently praised Brown's scholarship, though the affection was not returned, with Brown  having commented that "Spong is complimentary in what he writes of me as a NT scholar; ... I hope I am not ungracious if in return I remark that I do not think that a single NT author would recognize Spong's Jesus as the figure being proclaimed or written about."

Spong's ideas have been criticized by some other theologians, notably in 1998 by Rowan Williams, the Bishop of Monmouth, who later became the Archbishop of Canterbury. Williams described Spong's Twelve Points for Reform as embodying "confusion and misinterpretation".

During a speaking tour in Australia in 2001, Spong was banned by Peter Hollingworth, the Archbishop of Brisbane, from speaking at churches in the diocese. The tour coincided with Hollingworth leaving the diocese to become the Governor-General of Australia. Hollingworth said that it was not an appropriate moment for Spong to "engage congregations in matters that could prove theologically controversial". After Spong's book Jesus for the Non-Religious was published in 2007, Peter Jensen, the Archbishop of Sydney, banned Spong from preaching at any churches in his diocese. By contrast, Phillip Aspinall, the Primate of Australia, invited Spong in 2007 to deliver two sermons at St John's Cathedral, Brisbane.

Following Spong's death, Mark Tooley told The Washington Times that "he [Spong] claimed that he was making religion relevant for a new generation who could not believe in the supernatural, often citing his daughters. But the irony was that as he was making his case, modernity was ending and postmodernity starting, and his rationalist perspective became passé. There was new openness to the supernatural."

Albert Mohler, president of the Southern Baptist Theological Seminary, described Spong's teaching as constituting the historic definition of heresy, having "denied virtually every major Christian doctrine."

Death
Spong died in sleep at his home in Richmond, Virginia, on September 12, 2021, at the age of 90. The notice was announced by the St. Paul's Episcopal Church in Richmond, Virginia, where Spong had once been rector.

Publications

 1973 – Honest Prayer, 
 1974 – This Hebrew Lord, 
 1975 – Christpower, 
 1975 – Dialogue: In Search of Jewish-Christian Understanding (co-authored with Rabbi Jack Daniel Spiro), 
 1976 – Life Approaches Death: A Dialogue on Ethics in Medicine
 1977 – The Living Commandments, 
 1980 – The Easter Moment, 
 1983 – Into the Whirlwind: The Future of the Church, 
 1986 – Beyond Moralism: A Contemporary View of the Ten Commandments (co-authored with Denise G. Haines, Archdeacon), 
 1987 – Consciousness and Survival: An Interdisciplinary Inquiry into the Possibility of Life Beyond Biological Death (edited by John S. Spong, introduction by Claiborne Pell), 
 1988 – Living in Sin? A Bishop Rethinks Human Sexuality, 
 1991 – Rescuing the Bible from Fundamentalism: A Bishop Rethinks the Meaning of Scripture, 
 1992 – Born of a Woman: A Bishop Rethinks the Birth of Jesus, 
 1994 – Resurrection: Myth or Reality? A Bishop's Search for the Origins of Christianity, 
 1996 – Liberating the Gospels: Reading the Bible with Jewish Eyes, 
 1999 – Why Christianity Must Change or Die: A Bishop Speaks to Believers In Exile, 
 2001 – Here I Stand: My Struggle for a Christianity of Integrity, Love and Equality, 
 2002 – God in Us: A Case for Christian Humanism (with Anthony Freeman), 
 2002 – A New Christianity for a New World: Why Traditional Faith Is Dying and How a New Faith Is Being Born, 
 2005 – The Sins of Scripture: Exposing the Bible's Texts of Hate to Reveal the God of Love, 
 2007 – Jesus for the Non-Religious, 
 2009 – Eternal Life: A New Vision: Beyond Religion, Beyond Theism, Beyond Heaven and Hell, 
 2011 – Re-claiming the Bible for a Non-Religious World, 
 2013 – The Fourth Gospel: Tales of a Jewish Mystic, 
 2016 – Biblical Literalism: A Gentile Heresy, 
 2018 – Unbelievable: Why Neither Ancient Creeds Nor the Reformation Can Produce a Living Faith Today,

References

External links

 

1931 births
2021 deaths
20th-century American Episcopalians
20th-century American essayists
20th-century American male writers
20th-century American philosophers
21st-century American Episcopalians
21st-century American essayists
21st-century American male writers
21st-century American philosophers
American Episcopal theologians
American ethicists
American humanists
American male essayists
American male non-fiction writers
American spiritual writers
Christian humanists
Christian philosophers
Episcopal bishops of Newark
LGBT and Anglicanism
American LGBT rights activists
Members of the Jesus Seminar
Panentheists
Philosophers of culture
Philosophers of love
Philosophers of religion
Philosophers of sexuality
Religious naturalists
Social philosophers
Theorists on Western civilization
University of North Carolina at Chapel Hill alumni
Writers about activism and social change
Writers about religion and science
Writers from Charlotte, North Carolina
Yale Divinity School alumni
Yale University alumni